Kirazlıbent Nature Park is a nature park located in the Eyüp district of Istanbul Province, Turkey. 

Kirazlıbent Nature Park is situated inside the Belgrad Forest in Eyüp. The area was declared a nature park by the Ministry of Environment and Forest in 2011, and is one of the nine nature parks inside the Belgrad Forest. The protected area is named after the dam Kirazlıbent, which was built by the Ottoman sultan Mahmud II (reigned 1808–1839) at the Kirazlı Creek in 1818.

The nature park offers outdoor recreation activities such as hiking, cycling and picnicing for visitors on daily basis. There are playgrounds for children. Admission is charged for visitors and vehicles.

Ecosystem
 Flora
The plants found in the forest area of the nature park are sessile oak (Quercus petraea), Kasnak oak (Quercus vulcanica), sweet chestnut (Castanea sativa), hornbeam (Carpinus betulus), black pine (Pinus nigra), oriental beech (Fagus orientalis), common ivy (Hedera helix), (Smilax excelsa), butcher's-broom (Ruscus aculeatus) and tree heath (Erica arborea).

Fauna
Animals observed in the nature park are the mammals red deer, red fox, wild boar, golden jackal, porcupine, squirrel, the reptile tortoise and the bird species goldfinch, passer and magpie.

See also

 Ayvat Bendi Nature Park
 Bentler Nature Park
 Falih Rıfkı Atay Nature Park
 Fatih Çeşmesi Nature Park
 Irmak Nature Park
 Kömürcübent Nature Park
 Mehmet Akif Ersoy Nature Park
 Neşet Suyu Nature Park

References

Nature parks in Turkey
Protected areas established in 2011
2011 establishments in Turkey
Parks in Istanbul
Eyüp
Belgrad Forest